Live: Keep Bangin' on the Walls is an album by British band Asian Dub Foundation, released on 3 December 2003.

Track listing
"Cyberabad"
"Charge"
"Blowback"
"2 Face"
"Fortress Europe"
"Riddim I Like"
"New Way New Life"
"Rise to the Challenge"
"Assatta Dub"
"Enemy of the Enemy"
"La Haine"
"Naxalite"
"Free Satpal Ram"
"Dhol Rinse"
"Rebel Warrior"

References

Asian Dub Foundation albums
2003 live albums
2003 video albums
Live video albums